Unisław Śląski is a village in the administrative district of Gmina Mieroszów, within Wałbrzych County, Lower Silesian Voivodeship, in south-western Poland.

Cannabalism 
In Langwaltersdorf, today's Unisław Śląski, a macabre crime described all over the world took place. The shocking story took place in the summer of 1895, when the crime was committed by a German woman.

References

Villages in Wałbrzych County